Thomas Bickham, also known as Tomboy (born 29 March 1975 in Værløse), is a Danish drag queen, stylist, hairdresser, designer and TV personality.

Bickham was originally trained as a clothing operator, but already as a 19 year old he started performing as a drag queen. Among other things, he has participated in the Danish TV shows Big Brother VIP (Denmark) 2003 (which he won), The Lyrics Board and De Fantastiske 5 (Danish version of Queer Eye), as well as several TV ads.

He released the album Ok 2 B Gay in 2006, using the alias Tomboy.

LGBT Denmark awarded him "homo of the year" for his 2003 participation in Big Brother VIP.

References

External links 
 
 Thomas Bickham official YouTube channel
 Fra dragqueen til kirkesanger Kristeligt Dagblad 15. October 2008

Reality show winners
Danish designers
Hairdressers
1975 births
Living people
21st-century Danish male singers
Danish drag queens
Danish gay musicians
Danish LGBT singers
Gay singers
People from Furesø Municipality